Leonardus van der Laan (20 April 1864 – 17 March 1942) was a Dutch  architect.

Life
Leo van der Laan was born in The Hague. He married Anna Maria Louise Stadhouder, with whom he had eleven children, among them Dom Hans van der Laan, Jan van der Laan and Nico van der Laan, who all also became  architects.

Van der Laan worked as an independent architect from 1891 in Leiden. From 1921 he worked in partnership with his son Jan after the latter had completed his training at the Technische Hogeschool in Delft. The two of them were responsible for the design of about 400 buildings  in Leiden and the surrounding area.

Notable works
 St. Elisabeth's Hospital, Leiden, 1909 (presently  student accommodation)
 St. Joseph's Church, Leiden, 1925 ("Herensingelkerk")
 St. Leonard's Church, Leiden, 1925
 Department store Vroom & Dreesmann, Leiden, 1936 (with leaded lights by Joep Nicolas)

Bibliography 
 David Geneste, Albert Gielen & Rick Wassenaar: L. van der Laan (1864-1942), J.A. van der Laan (1896-1966). Een katholieke architectenfamilie -rechtzinnig, maar veelzijdig en pragmatisch. Rotterdam, Stichting BONAS, 2002.

External links 
 Archive of Leo and Jan van der Laan at the Nederlands Architectuur Instituut 

Dutch architects
People from Leiden
1864 births
1942 deaths